Temagami/Mine Landing Water Aerodrome  is located  southwest of Temagami, Ontario, Canada on the east-central shore of Lake Temagami.

See also
 Temagami Water Aerodrome

References

Registered aerodromes in Ontario
Transport in Temagami
Seaplane bases in Ontario
Airports in Nipissing District